The 2019 Toray Pan Pacific Open was a professional women's tennis tournament played on outdoor hard courts. It was the 36th edition of the Pan Pacific Open, and part of the Premier Series of the 2019 WTA Tour. It took place at the ITC Utsubo Tennis Center in Osaka, Japan, on 16–22 September 2019. This was the only time Osaka hosting the tournament after Tokyo was in preparation for the Summer Olympics the following year.

Points and prize money

Point distribution

Prize money

Singles main-draw entrants

Seeds

 Rankings are as of September 9, 2019

Other entrants
The following players received wild cards into the main singles draw:
  Misaki Doi
  Nao Hibino

The following players received entry from the singles qualifying draw:
  Alizé Cornet 
  Zarina Diyas
  Varvara Flink 
  Nicole Gibbs 
  Han Xinyun 
  Viktoriya Tomova

The following players received entry as lucky losers:
  Whitney Osuigwe
  Katarzyna Kawa

Withdrawals
  Bianca Andreescu → replaced by  Monica Puig
  Belinda Bencic → replaced by  Alison Riske
  Anett Kontaveit → replaced by  Anastasia Pavlyuchenkova
  Petra Martić → replaced by  Katarzyna Kawa
  Anastasija Sevastova → replaced by  Whitney Osuigwe
  Markéta Vondroušová → replaced by  Yulia Putintseva

Retirements
  Madison Keys (left foot injury)

Doubles main-draw entrants

Seeds

 Rankings are as of September 9, 2019

Other entrants 
The following pair received a wildcard into the doubles main draw:
  Momoko Kobori /  Ayano Shimizu

The following pair received entry as alternates:
  Francesca Di Lorenzo /  Katarzyna Kawa

Withdrawals 
Before the tournament
  Anastasija Sevastova (gastrointestinal illness)

Champions

Singles

  Naomi Osaka def.  Anastasia Pavlyuchenkova, 6–2, 6–3

Doubles

  Chan Hao-ching /  Latisha Chan def.  Hsieh Su-wei /  Hsieh Yu-chieh, 7–5, 7–5

References

External links 
 

 
2019 WTA Tour
2019
2019 in Japanese women's sport
September 2019 sports events in Japan
Pan